Depukhu, also  or  in Newar language,  in English, and  in Nepali, is a festival celebrated in August each year by the Newar community of Khokana in central Nepal. It involves the ritual sacrifice of a virgin she-goat (often a kid) in the Deopokhari pond which is situated in the premises of Rudrayani temple in Khokana, in a process described as inhumane and barbaric by animal rights activists. Once taken as a matter of cultural pride, international outcry and criticism has led the locals to attempt to reform the festival in recent years.

Background and introduction
The tradition of the festival is believed to have begun around the 12th century. According to folklore, as the number of deaths by slipping and falling into the pond rose, the belief that an angry supernatural being inhabited the pond began to take hold. Consequently, the festival begun with sacrifices of a virgin she-goat once a year to the demon or angry god that resides in the pond, so that people using the pond are spared for the rest of the year. The festival is celebrated annually the day after Gaijatra, which is mid-August, by the Newar community in and around the ancient village of Khokana in Lalitpur District.

Goat sacrifice ritual

While a huge crowd gathers around the pond and on rooftops to watch the ritual, a young man jumps into the pond with a live young female goat on his shoulders. While he attempts to drown the goat, other young men from various communities in and around Khokana join him. They work together to prevent the goat from escaping. While the group tries to drown the goat, the youths also bite her with their teeth, and attempt to rip her apart with their bare hands. The goat is reported to struggle for as long as forty minutes before she dies. Once the goat is dead, a competition ensues for the possession of the carcass. Youths from different communities struggle to win it for their community, which earns them the privilege of leading the religious procession that follows. The struggle and tug-of-war for the possession of the carcass is reported to last as long as 90 minutes. The youths that win lead a procession out of the pond, concluding the ritual sacrifice.

Controversy
In recent years, animal rights activists have opposed the festival for causing unnecessary suffering to an innocent animal, calling it barbaric and inhumane. The  organising committee has repeatedly appealed not to bring the festival into controversy as it is a very old tradition and a part of the local community's cultural heritage. Some in the community have advocated continuing the festival in its traditional form, terming it "Khokana's pride" while others have advocated change arguing that the festival had tarnished Khokana's reputation at the world stage.

Attempted reforms
Some years before 2013, an attempt was reportedly made to replace goat sacrifice with a symbolic sacrifice of a pumpkin brought from Rudrayani temple, but it had minimal impact as the tradition continued unchanged.

Setopati reported that, in 2017, the sacrifice ritual was different from years before. While the kid was still drowned by a group of youths, there was no additional violence done upon her before or after her death.

See also
Gadhimai festival
Dashain
Yulin dog meat festival
Speciesism

References

Festivals in Nepal
Hindu festivals
Newar
Animal rights